The Annunciation Diptych or the Orsini Altarpiece is a two-panel tempera on panel altarpiece painted in 1333 by Simone Martini, now in the Royal Museum of Fine Arts, Antwerp, to which it was bequeathed by Florent van Ertborn, mayor of Antwerp, along with other works by the same artist.

Other Martini Annunciations

References

Paintings depicting the Annunciation
Paintings in the collection of the Royal Museum of Fine Arts Antwerp
Diptychs
Paintings by Simone Martini
1330s paintings